Hongyun Subdistrict is a subdistrict and the seat of Dingcheng District in Changde Prefecture-level City, Hunan, China. Dividing a part of the former Wuling Town, the subdistrict was formed in 2013.

See also 
 List of township-level divisions of Hunan

References

External links
 Official Website (Chinese / 中文)

Dingcheng District
Subdistricts of Hunan
County seats in Hunan